This pages contains a List of Österreichische Basketball Bundesliga (ÖBL) season scoring leaders.

Leaders

References

Scoring leaders